The Army of West Mississippi was a Union army that served in the Western Theater of the American Civil War. It was virtually the same force as the Army of the Gulf, but was renamed when it became a part of the Military Division of West Mississippi, in the Department of the Gulf commanded by Maj. Gen. Edward Canby.

History
After the disastrous Red River Campaign, Nathaniel P. Banks resigned from the army and command of the Department of the Gulf was given to Gen. Stephen Hurlbut, but the military forces in the region that comprised the Army of the Gulf saw little action.  In August 1864, units from the department participated in the land attack at the Battle of Mobile Bay, directly commanded by Gen. Gordon Granger.

In 1865, the XIII Corps and XVI Corps were transferred to the eponymous Military Division of West Mississippi under the command of General Canby, who named the military division's field forces the Army of West Mississippi.  The army fought in the Battle of Spanish Fort and the subsequent Battle of Fort Blakely.  When Canby was later appointed commander of the Department of the Gulf, the forces again took the title Army of the Gulf.

Commander
 Major General E.R.S. Canby  (1865)

Major Battles
 Battle of Spanish Fort  (Canby)
 Battle of Fort Blakely  (Canby)

West Mississippi, Army of
Alabama in the American Civil War
1865 establishments in the United States
Military units and formations established in 1865
Military units and formations disestablished in 1865